The Berlin Graduate School of North American Studies (GSNAS) is affiliated with the John F. Kennedy Institute for North American Studies at the Free University Berlin. It was distinguished by the German Universities Excellence Initiative in 2006, a nationwide competition carried out by the Federal Ministry of Education and Research, together with the German Research Foundation.   The GSNAS was officially opened by the former German minister for foreign affairs, Joschka Fischer, in November 2007. Speakers of the Graduate School of North American Studies are Prof. Dr. Ulla Haselstein and Prof. Dr. Winfried Fluck.

Vision 
By combining closely supervised doctoral education with excellent theoretical and methodological research training, the Graduate School of North American Studies enables its doctoral candidates to complete outstanding dissertations within a period of three years, and prepares them for a career in universities, research institutions, other science-related organizations, think tanks, scientific journalism etc. 
Under the overall research concept “The Challenges of Freedom”, the Graduate School of North American Studies focuses on the social, economic, and cultural changes in the North American Societies at the beginning of the 21st century in a comprehensive and interdisciplinary way.

Research areas 
 American Exceptionalism in a Changing World
 Nation, Ethnicity, Diaspora, and Borderlands
 Conservative Revolution and New Social Movements
 Religion in Public Life
 Arts, Aesthetics, and American Culture
 The Struggle over the Public Sphere: Media and Cultural Narratives
 Neoliberalism as an Economic and Cultural Paradigm
 Globalization and the "American centuries"

Program 
The program is aimed at doctoral candidates who intend to write a dissertation in one of the following disciplines: Cultural and Literary Studies, History, Political Science, Sociology, or Economics. In interdisciplinary seminars, students acquire comprehensive knowledge of the historical, social, cultural, and economic changes facing North America in the first quarter of the new century. In-depth theoretical and methodological training is provided in disciplinary seminars. As a third module, courses on professional skills (advanced academic writing, management, presentation, didactic skills) are obligatory. The language of instruction is English.

The extensive Visiting Professor-Program of the Graduate School allows its students to intensively discuss their ideas and projects with internationally renowned scholars like José Casanova (Georgetown University), Tyler Cowen (George Mason University), Jack P. Greene (Brown University), David Harvey (City University of New York), Akira Iriye (Harvard), Jackson Lears (Rutgers University), Donald E. Pease (Dartmouth College), Carla Peterson (University of Maryland) und Hayden White (Stanford University).

Faculty 

 Frank Adloff
 Marianne Braig
 Gerhard Braun
 Irwin Collier
 Winfried Fluck
 Jürgen Gerhards
 Michaela Hampf
 Ulla Haselstein
 Carl-Ludwig Holtfrerich (Emeritus)
 Heinz Ickstadt (Emeritus)
 Hermann Kappelhoff
 Knud Krakau (Emeritus)
 Christoph Haehling v. Lanzenauer
 Ursula Lehmkuhl
 Margit Mayer
 Winfried Menninghaus
 Paul Nolte
 Thomas Risse
 Moritz Schularick
 Sabine Schülting
 Bärbel Tischleder
 Lora Anne Viola
 Harald Wenzel

Partner institutions 
The Graduate School of North American Studies cooperates with the American Studies Programs of the following universities and colleges in North America:  Brown University, Dartmouth College, Harvard University, Stanford University, University of California at Berkeley, University of North Carolina at Chapel Hill, and Yale University. It also cooperates with University College Dublin. In addition, partnerships exist with the Hertie School of Governance (Berlin), the American Academy in Berlin (Berlin), the Canadian Universities Centre (Berlin), the German Council on Foreign Relations (DGAP), the German Institute for Economic Research, the German Institute for International and Security Affairs, the Fritz Thyssen Foundation and the Terra Foundation.

Admission 
The annual deadline for applications is January 31. For further information on the application procedure, please see www.gsnas.fu-berlin.de

See also
 Free University Berlin
 John F. Kennedy-Institute for North American Studies

Notes

External links 
Free University Berlin
 Graduate School of North American Studies
 John F. Kennedy Institute for North American Studies

American studies
American culture
Historiography of the United States
Cultural studies organizations
Educational institutions established in 2006
2006 establishments in Germany